Van Halen was an American rock band formed in Pasadena, California in 1972 by the Dutch-born American brothers Eddie Van Halen (guitar) and Alex Van Halen (drums), plus singer David Lee Roth and bassist Michael Anthony. The band's discography consists of 12 studio albums, two live albums, two compilation albums, and 56 singles.

The band signed a contract with Warner Bros. Records in 1977, and in the following year released the album Van Halen. Over the next few years, the band alternated album releases, one per year between 1979 and 1982, and touring to increasing commercial and critical acclaim, becoming one of the world's most successful and influential rock bands. In 1984, Van Halen released 1984, which peaked at No. 2 on the Billboard 200 and had the band's sole No. 1 hit on the Billboard Hot 100, "Jump". After the tour promoting that album, Roth left the band due to artistic and personal tensions with Eddie.

To replace Roth, Eddie picked Sammy Hagar, formerly of Montrose and at that time a very successful solo artist. Van Halen's first album with Hagar, 1986's 5150, was the band's first No. 1 on the Billboard 200. The three studio albums that succeeded, OU812, For Unlawful Carnal Knowledge and Balance, also topped the charts. In 1996, Hagar left Van Halen amidst similar tension with the Van Halen brothers.

Roth rejoined briefly and recorded two songs with the band for the 1996 compilation Best Of – Volume I, but Van Halen eventually settled on Gary Cherone, frontman of the then defunct Boston-based band Extreme. Cherone's sole release with the band was Van Halen III, released in 1998 to mixed reviews and diminishing sales, being the only Van Halen studio album not to get a platinum RIAA certification. Van Halen's last release for Warner was the 2004 compilation Best of Both Worlds, which featured three new songs with Hagar. In 2011, the band left the label and signed with Interscope Records.

In February 2012, Van Halen released its 12th studio album and first for Interscope, A Different Kind of Truth, featuring Roth on vocals and Eddie's son Wolfgang on bass guitar. The album debuted at number two on the Billboard 200, and became the band's highest-charting album on the UK Albums Chart with a sixth spot.

, Van Halen has sold 75 million albums worldwide  and have thirteen No. 1 hits on the Billboard Mainstream Rock chart. During the 1980s, they, along with the band Heart, had more Billboard Hot 100 hits, fifteen, than any other hard rock or heavy metal band. According to the RIAA, Van Halen is the 19th best-selling music group/artist of all time with sales of over 56 million albums in the US, and is one of five rock bands that have had two albums (Van Halen and 1984) sell more than ten million copies in the US.

Albums

Studio albums

Live albums

Compilation albums

Singles

Notes
 1^ UK and NL position for 1980 re-release
 A^ released in Japan
 B^ released in some European territories
 C^ released in Europe and Japan
 D^ released in the Netherlands

Videos

References

External links
 

Discography
Discographies of American artists
Rock music group discographies
Heavy metal group discographies